Potamopyrgus is a genus of minute freshwater snails with an operculum, aquatic gastropod molluscs or micromolluscs in the family Tateidae.

Description
Stimpson (1865) described the genus as follows: “Shell ovate-conic, imperforate; apex acute; whorls coronated with spines; outer whorl nearly two-thirds the length of the shell; aperture ovate, outer lip acute.  Operculum corneous, subspiral.  Foot rather short for the length of the shell, broadest in front and strongly auriculated.  Tentacles very long, slender, and tapering.  Eyes on very prominent tubercles.  Rostrum of moderate size.”

Distribution
This genus is endemic to New Zealand and south eastern Australia.

However, one species within this genus, P. antipodarum, has been accidentally introduced in many countries worldwide, especially in Europe and North America, and has become a problematic invasive species.

Species
Species within the genus Potamopyrgus include:
 Potamopyrgus acus Haase, 2008
 Potamopyrgus alexenkoae Anistratenko in Anistratenko & Stadnichenko, 1995
 Potamopyrgus antipodarum J. E. Gray, 1843 - (syn. Potamopyrgus jenkinsi)
 Potamopyrgus ciliatus (Gould, 1850)
 Potamopyrgus corolla (Gould 1852) (Type species)
 Potamopyrgus dawbini Powell, 1955
 Potamopyrgus doci Haase, 2008
 Potamopyrgus estuarinus Winterbourn, 1970
 Potamopyrgus kaitunaparaoa Haase, 2008
 Potamopyrgus melvilli Hedley, 1916
 Potamopyrgus oppidanus Haase, 2008
 Potamopyrgus oscitans  Iredale, 1944
 Potamopyrgus polistchuki Anistratenko, 1991
 Potamopyrgus pupoides Hutton, 1882
 Potamopyrgus troglodytes Climo, 1974

Species brought into synonymy
 Potamopyrgus amazonicus Haas, 1949: synonym of Dyris amazonicus (Haas, 1949)
 Potamopyrgus brevior Ancey, 1905: synonym of Fluviopupa brevior (Ancey, 1905)
 Potamopyrgus cresswelli Climo, F. M., 1974: synonym of Rakiurapyrgus cresswelli (Climo, 1974)
 Potamopyrgus gardneri Climo, 1974: synonym of Rakipyrgus gardneri (Climo, 1974)
 Potamopyrgus jenkinsi E. A. Smith, 1889: synonym of Potamopyrgus antipodarum J.E. Gray, 1843
 Potamopyrgus manneringi Climo, 1974: synonym of Leptopyrgus manneringi (Climo, 1974)
 Potamopyrgus ruppiae Hedley, 1912: synonym of Ascorhis victoriae Tenison-Woods, 1878
 Potamopyrgus subterraneus Suter, 1905: synonym of Tongapyrgus subterraneus (Suter, 1905)

References

 Powell A. W. B., New Zealand Mollusca, William Collins Publishers Ltd, Auckland, New Zealand 1979 
Criscione, F. and W.F. Ponder. 2013. A phylogenetic analysis of rissooidean and cingulopsoidea families (Gastropoda: Caenogastropoda).  Molecular Phylogenetics and Evolution 66(3):1075-1082.
 Stimson, W. 1865.  Diagnoses of newly discovered genera of Gasteropods, belonging to the sub-fam. Hydrobiinae, of the family Rissoidae.  American Journal of Conchology 1:52-54.
 Vaught, K.C. (1989). A classification of the living Mollusca. American Malacologists: Melbourne, FL (USA). . XII, 195 pp
Winterbourn, M. 1970. The New Zealand species of Potamopyrgus (Gastropoda, Hydrobiidae). Malacalogia 10(2):283-321

Tateidae
Gastropods of New Zealand
Taxa named by William Stimpson